Tachidiidae is a family of copepods belonging to the order Harpacticoida.

Genera:
 Cithadius Bowman, 1972
 Euterpina Norman, 1903
 Geeopsis Huys, 1996
 Microarthridion Lang, 1944
 Neotachidius Shen & Tai, 1963
 Sinotachidius Huys, Ohtsuka, Conroy-Dalton & Kikuchi, 2005
 Tachidiinae Boeck, 1865
 Tachidius Lilljeborg, 1853

References

Copepods